BRP Datu Kalantiaw (PS-76) was the first of three ex-USN s that served with the Philippine Navy, the others being BRP Datu Sikatuna (PS-77/PF-5) and BRP Rajah Humabon (PS-78/PF-11). She was also the flagship of the Philippine Navy from 1967 to 1981.

History

She served in the Pacific theater in the middle of 1945 until she was decommissioned on 14 June 1946. Booth was placed in "deferred disposal status pending possible transfer to a foreign government" on 7 July 1947, and two days later was towed back to Mayport by ATA-209, where the former convoy escort was inactivated on 28 July 1947.

Reconditioned by the Brewer Dry Dock Co., Staten Island, New York, the ship was loaned to the Republic of the Philippines under the Military Assistance Program on 15 December 1967. The Philippine Navy commissioned her on that day at the Philadelphia Navy Yard as RPS Datu Kalantiaw (PS-76). On 30 June 1975, while she was still operating on loan under a foreign flag, the destroyer escort was re-designated a frigate, FF-170. Subsequently, given the Philippine Navy's continuing need for the ship "in the interest of National Defense Requirements and in the furtherance of the Security Alliance between the Philippines and the United States," the U.S. Navy disposed of her by Foreign Military Sale and Booth was stricken from the Naval Vessel Register on 15 July 1978.

In July 1980, in line with the re-classification of all Philippine Navy ships, she was renamed BRP Datu Kalantiaw (PS-76) using a localized prefix to replace the previously used English prefix.

Datu Kalantiaw continued to serve under the Philippine flag until Typhoon Clara drove her aground on 21 September 1981 on the rocky northern shore of Calayan Island, in the northern Philippines. The ammunition ship , as she neared Subic Bay that day, slated for a period of upkeep, received orders to "get underway again that evening to coordinate rescue operations" at the scene of the tragedy. Consequently, Mount Hood, working in concert with Philippine Navy units "in a most adverse weather environment," retrieved 49 bodies in two days of operations, and ultimately sailed for Manila to turn them over to Philippine authorities, rescuers no longer hearing tapping from inside the ship that lay on her beam ends where Clara had cast her. Soon thereafter, Rear Admiral Simeon Alejandro, Flag Officer in Command of the Philippine Navy, "made an emotional address to the officers and men of Mount Hood upon the ship's arrival on Manila," the auxiliary's historian records, "thanking each man for his part in the mission and offering the gratitude of the Philippine nation to the Captain and crew." One contemporary account called the loss of Datu Kalantiaw "one of the worst disasters in the history of the Philippine Navy," 79 of the 97-man crew perishing.

Gallery

References

External links

 Philippine Defense Forum - RPS Datu Kalantiaw PS-76
 NavSource Online: Destroyer Escort Photo Archive
 Naming and Code Designation of PN Ships

Datu Kalantiaw-class frigates
Ships built in Kearny, New Jersey
1943 ships
Maritime incidents in 1981
Shipwrecks in the Philippine Sea